Nabor can refer to:

People
Nabor (died c. 303), Christian saint, martyred with Felix
Nabor (died c. 303), Christian saint, martyred with Basilides, Cyrinus, and Nazarius
Nabor Carrillo Flores (1911–1967), Mexican nuclear physicist
Paul Nabor (1928–2014), Belizean musician
Nabor Vargas García (born 1976), Mexican drug lord.

Animals
Naborr, born as Nabor (1950–1977), gray Arabian stallion

Places
Saint-Nabor in Alsace-Champagne-Ardenne-Lorraine, France
Nousseviller-Saint-Nabor in Alsace-Champagne-Ardenne-Lorraine, France

Companies
Nabors Industries, and oil and gas drilling and well servicing company in Bermuda and Texas

See also
Naber, a surname